Garra alticaputus is a species of cyprinid fish in the genus Garra described from the Dikrong River at Boorum village Itanagar, Arunachal Pradesh, India.

Etymology

The name alticaputus came from a Latin word which refers to the deep head of the species.

References 

Garra
Fish described in 2013